Duncan John Rushworth Taylor  (born 17 October 1958) is a British retired diplomat whose most recent post was ambassador to Mexico.

Career
Educated at Highgate School and Trinity College, Cambridge, he joined the United Kingdom Foreign and Commonwealth Office (FCO) in 1982 as a Desk Officer in its West Africa department. In 2005, he was appointed the British High Commissioner for Barbados and the Eastern Caribbean, which covered Antigua and Barbuda, the Commonwealth of Dominica, Grenada, Saint Kitts and Nevis, Saint Lucia, and Saint Vincent and the Grenadines. He became the governor of the Cayman Islands on 15 January 2010. His appointment as ambassador to Mexico was announced in May 2013. In April 2018 the FCO announced that he was to be replaced in October 2018 and was retiring from the Diplomatic Service.

Personal life
Duncan Taylor is the son of Sir Jock Taylor, also a diplomat, and the grandson of Sir John Taylor (1895–1974), who was also ambassador to Mexico. He is married to Marie-Beatrice and has three daughters and two sons.

References
TAYLOR, Duncan John Rushworth, Who's Who 2013, A & C Black, 2013; online edn, Oxford University Press, Dec 2012

1958 births
Living people
People educated at Highgate School
Alumni of Trinity College, Cambridge
High Commissioners of the United Kingdom to Barbados
High Commissioners of the United Kingdom to Antigua and Barbuda
High Commissioners of the United Kingdom to Dominica
High Commissioners of the United Kingdom to Grenada
High Commissioners of the United Kingdom to Saint Lucia
High Commissioners of the United Kingdom to Saint Vincent and the Grenadines
High Commissioners of the United Kingdom to Saint Kitts and Nevis
Governors of the Cayman Islands
Ambassadors of the United Kingdom to Mexico